Zgornja Kapla is a dispersed settlement in the hills north of the Drava River in the Municipality of Podvelka in Slovenia, on the border with Austria.

Name
The name Zgornja Kapla literally means 'upper Kapla', distinguishing the settlement from neighboring Spodnja Kapla (literally, 'lower Kapla'). Like other settlements named Kapla (e.g., Kapla in the Municipality of Tabor) and similar names (e.g., Kaplja vas, Kapljišče, and Železna Kapla in Austria), the name is derived from the Slovene common noun *kapla 'chapel' (< *kapela < MHG and OHG kappella < Latin cappella 'chapel'), referring to a local religious structure.

Mass graves
Zgornja Kapla is the site of three known mass graves or unmarked graves associated with the Second World War. All of the victims were murdered in May 1945 by the Jože Lacko Detachment of the Partisan forces. It contains the remains of about 45 Hungarian civilians. It contains the remains of a Slovene that was murdered because he had been mobilized into the German military. It contains the remains of a person murdered on suspicion of being an informant.

Church
The parish church in the settlement is dedicated to Saint Catherine and belongs to the Roman Catholic Archdiocese of Maribor. It is first mentioned in written documents dating to 1389. The current building dates to after 1813, when the old church burned down.

References

External links

Zgornja Kapla on Geopedia

Populated places in the Municipality of Podvelka